Måre is a village in central Denmark, located in Nyborg municipality on the island of Funen in Region of Southern Denmark. Måre and the village of Herrested used to be separate villages, but have today grown together.

History
Herrested has existed since at least 1258, where it was granted the status of a market town (Danish: Købstad) by Valdemar II. This lasted until 1415 where it became a birk. 

Herrested Church was built around year 1100.

References

Cities and towns in the Region of Southern Denmark
Populated places in Funen
Nyborg Municipality
Villages in Denmark